Manambina is a town and commune in Madagascar. It belongs to the district of Miandrivazo, which is a part of Menabe Region. The population of the commune was estimated to be approximately 7,000 in 2001 commune census.

Only primary schooling is available. The majority 65% of the population of the commune are farmers, while an additional 20% receives their livelihood from raising livestock. The most important crop is rice, while other important products are maize and sweet potatoes.  Services provide employment for 5% of the population. Additionally fishing employs 10% of the population.

Roads
This municipality is crossed by the National road 34

References 

Populated places in Menabe